His Last Dollar is a lost 1914 American comedy silent film directed by Frank Powell and written by David Higgins. The film stars David Higgins, Betty Gray, Hal Clarendon, Edgar L. Davenport, Wellington A. Playter and Jack Pickford. The film was released on October 29, 1914, by Paramount Pictures.

Plot

Cast 
David Higgins as Joe Braxton
Betty Gray as Eleanor Downs
Hal Clarendon as Linson
Edgar L. Davenport as Colonel Downs 
Wellington A. Playter as Broker
Jack Pickford as Jockey Jones
Nat G. Deverich as Jockey Ross

References

External links 
 
 

1914 films
1910s English-language films
Silent American comedy films
1914 comedy films
Paramount Pictures films
American black-and-white films
Lost American films
American silent feature films
1914 lost films
Lost comedy films
Films directed by Frank Powell
1910s American films